Brandon Richard Flowers (born June 21, 1981) is an American musician, singer, songwriter, and philanthropist, best known as the lead singer, keyboardist, and occasional bassist of the Las Vegas-based rock band the Killers.

In addition to his work with the Killers, Flowers has released two solo albums, Flamingo (2010) and The Desired Effect (2015). He has reached number one on the UK Albums Chart nine times, and on the Billboard 200 once (top ten, eight times), including work by the Killers.

Early life 
Brandon Richard Flowers, the youngest of six children, was born on June 21, 1981, in the Las Vegas suburb of Henderson, Nevada, to Jean Yvonne (née Barlow; 1945–2010) and Terry Austin Flowers. He has an older brother and four older sisters. His family lived in Henderson until Flowers was eight, when they moved to Payson, Utah for two years before moving to Nephi, Utah, when he was in the sixth grade. Flowers lived in Nephi until his junior year at Juab High School, when in 1997, at 16, he moved back to Las Vegas to live with his aunt. He graduated from Chaparral High School in 1999. Flowers said that growing up in Las Vegas as a member of the Church of Jesus Christ of Latter-day Saints (LDS Church) helped prepare him for the world of rock and roll: "Really, being a Mormon in Las Vegas prepared me for the lion's den. It is sin city. The things that go on, the lights, it's the ultimate rock and roll stage. Without Las Vegas, I would be a wreck."

Career

The Killers (2001–present) 

Flowers responded to an ad that Dave Keuning had placed in the Las Vegas Weekly in late 2001, whereupon they became the Killers. After several short-lived bassists and drummers, Flowers and Keuning were joined by bassist Mark Stoermer and drummer Ronnie Vannucci, and the line-up became official in August 2002. Between 2003 and 2017, they released five consecutive chart-topping studio albums and have sold over 22 million records worldwide. The Killers are among those artists who have spent more than 1,000 weeks on the UK music charts during their career.  Flowers wrote the lyrics to the single "All These Things That I've Done" and its popular refrain "I Got Soul, But I'm Not A Soldier" that numbered among the "100 Greatest Songs of All Time" by The Daily Telegraph and earned one of the band's seven Grammy nominations.  He is also the author of the lyrics of single "Mr. Brightside," which holds the record for most weeks spent on the UK Singles Chart (5 years or 260 weeks and counting).  Their second album Sam's Town, paid homage to Flowers' hometown and family, and earned the band their first BRIT Awards (Best International Album and Group), and included the chart-topping single "When You Were Young".  Before releasing their first Billboard 200 No.1 album Wonderful Wonderful (2017) and chart topping single "The Man," the band took a one-year hiatus during which Flowers released his second and most favorably reviewed solo album to that date.

On July 4, 2010, the Killers headlined the "Salute to the Military" USO Concert at the White House. They performed "God Bless America" and favorites from their catalogue. On June 22, 2013, the Killers headlined the 90,000-capacity Wembley Stadium, their biggest solo show to date.

Solo career (2010–present)

Flamingo (2010–11) 

Flowers debuted his solo act at the Shimmer Showroom in Las Vegas on August 15, 2010.  SPIN later named it one of "The 15 Best Shows of the Summer" before listing the Flamingo Road Tour as one of "The 25 Best Fall Tours"/"Must-See Fall Tours".

Flowers' debut solo album, Flamingo, was released worldwide and charted in the top ten albums in ten countries including the UK where it charted at number one. The album drew heavy influence from Flowers' hometown of Las Vegas, Nevada, and earned Flowers a Q Award nomination for Best Male Artist (2010). The first single from Flamingo, "Crossfire", was released on June 21. It became Flowers' first top ten single in the UK as a solo artist and was certified silver by the BPI. The video for "Crossfire" featured actress Charlize Theron and was nominated for Best Video at the NME Awards. Flamingo was Flowers' fourth consecutive studio album to reach no. 1 on the UK charts, including work by the Killers, who subsequently earned another two consecutive UK No. 1's.

The Desired Effect (2015) 

After some of the band members wanted "to take a break from touring and the rat race," Flowers decided to keep it going and record a second solo album. The Desired Effect was released on May 15, 2015. The album debuted at number one on the UK Albums Chart, making it Flowers' second consecutive solo number one album. Flowers stated that the album was "definitely going to be different" from his last album, and he referred to producer Ariel Rechtshaid (Vampire Weekend, HAIM, Taylor Swift) as his "co-captain". The album featured performances by notable artists including Bruce Hornsby, Tony Levin (Peter Gabriel), Joey Waronker (Beck), Carlos Alomar (David Bowie), and Kenny Aronoff (John Mellencamp). The Desired Effect is Flowers' highest yet ranked album on Metacritic and honored as the Album of the Year (2015) by The San Francisco Examiner.  Reviews positively described the album as Flowers' finest work since Hot Fuss. The album was preceded by positively reviewed singles "Can't Deny My Love", "Still Want You", "Lonely Town", and "I Can Change". Multiple tracks from the album were listed on Best Songs of 2015 So Far lists by publications including SPIN, NPR, and Mashable. Halfway through 2015, USA Today listed the album as one of the top five best albums of 2015 so far.

The Desired Effect Tour included performances in Europe and North America; it ran through October 1, 2015. MTV rated Flowers' tour stop at London's Brixton Academy five stars. Flowers performed for President Barack Obama in 2015 at the National Clean Energy Summit.  Flowers also performed at the Royal Variety Performance (2015) at Royal Albert Hall for members of the British Royal Family.

Flowers was one of two favorite artists asked to perform "Be Still" and "Home Means Nevada" at the funeral of former U.S. Senate Majority Leader Harry Reid on January 8, 2022.

Collaborations 
In addition to his work with the Killers, Flowers has collaborated with Alex Cameron, Avicii, New Order, and Robbie Williams.

Personal life 

Flowers married Tana Mundkowsky in 2005 and lives in Las Vegas, Nevada, and Park City, Utah. He wrote the song "Some Kind of Love" for his wife while she suffered from a kind of PTSD. He and his wife have three sons, born in 2007, 2009, and 2011. Their sons attended their first Killers concert in July 2017, at London's Hyde Park. His parents met as teenagers, and he wrote the song "A Dustland Fairytale" as a tribute to their marriage and lifelong romance. His grandmother was from Lithuania, and his cousin is Craig Barlow, an inductee to the Las Vegas Golf Hall of Fame.

He is a member of the LDS Church. In 2012, he discussed his religion on Scandinavian television show Skavlan. He and his family are featured in a promotional video on the church's website.

His portrait was painted by British artist Joe Simpson for his "Musician Portraits" series that was exhibited at the Royal Albert Hall in 2012.

Philanthropy 
From 2006 to 2016, the Killers released annual Christmas-themed singles and videos in aid of the charity Product Red, supporting The Global Fund to Fight AIDS, Tuberculosis and Malaria.  The singles later formed the charity compilation album Don't Waste Your Wishes (2016). Sir Elton John listed Flowers as one of his top five heroes while editing The Independent'''s World Aids Day special edition.  The Killers have also contributed songs for cover albums with proceeds going to charities supporting natural disaster relief (Rhythms del Mundo Classics) and famine-stricken areas (AHK-toong BAY-bi Covered).  The Killers co-organized a benefit concert in December 2017 for those affected by the 2017 Las Vegas shooting, raising more than $700,000.

 Artistry 
 Influences 
Flowers has listed Bruce Springsteen, Oingo Boingo, Duran Duran, Pet Shop Boys, The Smiths, the Cars, and Depeche Mode among his musical influences.

Musical style and vocals
Flowers is regarded as a prominent frontman of the new wave revival in the 2000s. As a solo artist Flowers first exhibited elements of heartland rock as well as new-wave-style alternative rock.  On his second album, Flowers exhibited greater pop tendencies, prompting Rolling Stone to dub The Desired Effect, "the best straight-up pop album made by a rock star in recent memory." Flowers is a tenor.

U2's lead singer Bono praised Flowers' voice to The Globe and Mail in 2015, saying "We need him on the radio .... His voice!"

 Discography 

 The Killers Hot Fuss (2004)Sam's Town (2006)Day & Age (2008)Battle Born (2012)Wonderful Wonderful (2017)Imploding the Mirage (2020)Pressure Machine (2021)

 Solo Flamingo (2010)The Desired Effect'' (2015)

Tours 
Flamingo Road Tour (2010–11)
The Desired Effect Tour (2015)

Awards and nominations 

Brandon Flowers has been awarded the Q Idol Award and appeared on multiple greatest-frontman-of-all-time lists published by various outlets.

The Killers have been nominated for seven GRAMMY Awards, eight BRIT Awards, and two World Music Awards.

See also 
List of UK Albums Chart number ones of the 2010s
List of people from Nevada
Music of Nevada

References

External links 

 
1981 births
Living people
21st-century American singers
Latter Day Saints from Nevada
American male singer-songwriters
American rock singers
American tenors
NME Awards winners
People from Henderson, Nevada
People from Nephi, Utah
The Killers members
American people of Lithuanian descent
HIV/AIDS activists
Singer-songwriters from Utah
Singer-songwriters from Nevada